Shift4 is an American payment processing company publicly listed on the New York Stock Exchange and based in Allentown, Pennsylvania. The company, founded in 1999 by the then 16-year-old Jared Isaacman, processes payments for over 200,000 businesses in the retail, hospitality, leisure and restaurant industries. Shift4 specializes in commerce solutions such as mobile payment software and hardware. When the company went public in 2020, Isaacman was still the CEO.

History

While working as an employee of a payment processing company, the 16-year-old Isaacman (who had already earned his GED and gone to work full-time) identified what he saw as inefficiencies in the industry. In response, he launched United Bank Card in his parents' basement in Far Hills, New Jersey. At the time, it generally took merchants about one month to set up a payment system and merchants had to pay for their credit card readers and sign a lengthy application. As an alternative, Isaacman's new company cut the set-up time to one day, gave merchants free credit card readers and only required merchants sign a two-page application.

In 2012, United Bank Card rebranded as Harbortouch to better reflect its point-of-sale and payment technology.

Between 2014 and 2017, the company expanded by acquiring multiple payment processing and point-of-sale companies, including Merchant Services Inc. (the same company Isaacman worked for as a teen).

The company rebranded once again in 2017 as Lighthouse Network, with Harbortouch becoming a subsidiary.

In 2017, the company - then operating as the Lighthouse Network -  acquired payment gateway provider Shift4 Corporation and rebranded itself as Shift4 Payments.

Shift4 went public on the NYSE in June 2020, raising $345 million through its IPO. The company is one of the few companies to go public in the months after the start of the COVID-19 pandemic. The company completed its "roadshow" for investors entirely online. The company was the first to ring the bell at the New York Stock Exchange after the trading floor was reopened following its shutdown because of the pandemic.

In November 2020, Shift4 announced the acquisition of 3dcart, an E-commerce platform. In January 2021, Shift4 rebranded this solution as Shift4Shop.

In March 2021, the company announced the acquisition of VenueNext, a provider of point-of-sale and payment solutions for stadiums, arena, and other entertainment venues. A year later, the company announced it acquired Finaro.

Services

The company's business model involves integrating payment processing services into various hardware and software products as well as the gathering of business intelligence.

It works primarily in the restaurant, hospitality, retail and e-commerce industries. Shift4 also offers cloud-based reporting and analytic software. In 2019, the company processed approximately 3.5 billion transactions.

References

Software companies of the United States
Payment service providers
American companies established in 1999